Elections to Mid Bedfordshire District Council were held on 6 May 1999. All 53 seats were up for election. The Conservative Party gained overall control of the council, increasing their number of seats from 22 to 34, whilst the Labour Party declined from having 20 seats in 1995 to 7.

Result

Ward Results
All results are listed below:

Numbers of ballots cast and the percentage (to two decimal places) were given in the results published by Mid Bedfordshire District Council, but checked against results taken from Plymouth University's Elections Centre, which gives the number of registered voters, and the percentage turnout for each ward.  Percentage change in turnout is compared with the same ward in the 1995 District Council election.

The percentage of the vote for each candidate was calculated compared with the number of ballots cast in the ward.  Note that in a ward with more than one seat, voters were allowed to place as many crosses on the ballot paper as seats.  The percentage change for each candidate is compared with the same candidate in the 1995 District Council election.

Candidates who were members of the council before the election are marked with an asterisk.

Ampthill

Arlesey

Aspley

Biggleswade Ivel

Biggleswade Stratton

Blunham

Campton & Meppershall

Clifton & Henlow

Clophill

Cranfield

Flitton, Greenfield & Pulloxhill

Flitwick East 

 

Results published by Mid Beds District Council show 2,204 ballot papers cast, a 49.93% turnout of an electorate of 4,414.  Results given by Plymouth University's Elections Centre show a turnout of 27.7% and an electorate of 4,147.

Flitwick West

Harlington

Haynes & Houghton Conquest

Langford

Marston

Maulden

Northill

Old Warden & Southill

Potton

Sandy All Saints

Sandy St Swithuns

Shefford

Shillington & Stondon

Stotfold

Wensley

Westoning

Woburn

Wrest

Notes

References 

1999
1999 English local elections